The Powers Hotel in Fargo, North Dakota, also known as The 400, was built in 1914 by Thomas F. Powers. It was designed by Hancock Brothers and William F. Kurke.

It was listed on the National Register of Historic Places in 1983. and was deemed significant "for its Sullivanesque architectural style as designed by the Hancock Brothers and William F. Kurke", for association with Thomas F. Powers, and, "for its role in the commercial development of North Broadway in Fargo, North Dakota."

References

Hotel buildings on the National Register of Historic Places in North Dakota
Hotel buildings completed in 1914
Buildings and structures in Fargo, North Dakota
National Register of Historic Places in Cass County, North Dakota
1914 establishments in North Dakota